Lego The Hobbit is a Lego-themed action-adventure video game developed by Traveller's Tales. The game was released by Warner Bros. Interactive Entertainment on 8 April 2014 in North America, and 11 April in Europe. The game is a follow-up to Lego The Lord of the Rings based on the first two Hobbit films; An Unexpected Journey and The Desolation of Smaug. It was released on PlayStation 3, PlayStation 4, PlayStation Vita, Xbox 360, Xbox One, Wii U, Nintendo 3DS, OS X and Microsoft Windows.

On 1 January 2019, all digital sales of the PS3 and Xbox 360 version of the game were halted. This was confirmed a few days later by publisher Warner Bros. Interactive. The game was later re-added to Steam on 27 April 2020 and on console stores on 6 May 2020.

Gameplay 
The game shows several features from the previous games, including a feature where the user should locate specific materials to build a big Lego object. When the user selects and input the correct materials a screen is displayed where the Lego machine is built and the player should select the correct pieces in exchange for studs.

Also the characters have different actions to perform, making the Dwarf Company a group with different capabilities during the mission, including someone with archery abilities, another that uses a big hammer that can move big objects, another with the ability to extract minerals from stones, and so on. Bilbo improves his abilities as the game advances: when he gains Sting he has the ability to be a more skilled fighter; and when he gets the One Ring he can disappear and build invisible Lego structures.

The game, similar to the latest Lego video games, is composed on a large map, rather than a single hub. The player can move among different events where different characters ask the player to retain a specific material from a mission or to exchange materials.

Plot 

Much like its predecessors, the game presents storylines from The Hobbit films: An Unexpected Journey and Desolation of Smaug. However, the developers modified the storylines to fit the events into a number of game chapters per film, as well as adding the humour the series has become known for.

DLC 
There are 4 DLCs that are included with this game. They are The Big Little Character Pack, Side Quest Character Pack, The Armory Pack and The Battle Pack.

Cancelled The Battle of the Five Armies DLC 
It was reported at the London Toy Fair in January 2014 that a DLC would be released covering the events of the final film in The Hobbit series, to be released around the time of the film at the end of that year. However, no DLC was released. Over a year later, in a correspondence with GameSpot it was revealed that, despite no actual cancellation of the DLC, there were no longer any plans to adapt the film as a DLC, nor to adapt it as another game.

Audio 
Similar to Lego The Lord of the Rings, Lego The Hobbit features talking minifigures, with their dialogue taken directly from the films. Additional voices were provided by Tim Bentinck, Liz May Brice, Clare Corbett, Duncan Duff, Daniel Fine, Joel Fry, Jenny Galloway, Andy Gathergood, Anna Koval, Jonathan Kydd, Steve Kynman, Jamie Lee, Andy Linden, Sara Beck Mather, James Naylor, Emma Pierson, Jason Pitt, Richard Ridings, Emma Tate, and Marcia Warren. Christopher Lee, who played Saruman in the film series, has an uncredited role as the game's narrator.

Reception

References 

Role-playing video games
Action-adventure games
Action role-playing video games
Hobbit (video game), The
Sentient toys in fiction
Split-screen multiplayer games
Nintendo 3DS games
Nintendo 3DS eShop games
Open-world video games
PlayStation 3 games
PlayStation 4 games
PlayStation Vita games
Traveller's Tales games
Video games based on films
Video game prequels
Warner Bros. video games
MGM Interactive games
Wii U games
Wii U eShop games
Windows games
Xbox 360 games
Xbox One games
2014 video games
Feral Interactive games
Middle-earth (film franchise) video games
Video games based on adaptations
3D platform games
The Hobbit (film series)
Works based on The Hobbit
Video games developed in the United Kingdom
Multiplayer and single-player video games